Rizal, officially the Municipality of Rizal,  is a 5th class municipality in the province of Cagayan, Philippines. According to the 2020 census, it has a population of 19,077 people.

Rizal, being on the border of Cagayan and Apayao provinces, has a cool climate similar to Baguio's. It attracts excursionists and vacationists anytime, especially in summer.

Rizal is home to Cagayan's legendary figures – Biuag and Malana – who were said to have fought their epic battle for supremacy over the hand of the beautiful "Maguinganay" by swapping volleys of uprooted trees and live cattle. Their hangouts, two high mountains and a steep trail called "escolta" from where they uprooted trees to hurl at one another, can still be seen in Malaueg (Rizal).

Local crops are corn, rice and tobacco. It is known before of its specie as "Matalag", which means men and women alike to go for its aroma and suaveness. Its bananas and mangoes have become a good source of revenue.

Etymology

It is named after Jose Rizal.

History

Spanish regime

The incorporation of the town was dated early 1500s during the Spanish era in the Philippines.  The name became permanently until 1903 when the town was renamed in the honor of the Philippine National Hero Dr. José Rizal.

During the Spanish regime, the town was said to be the rest spots of the Spanish Authorities, friars and some locals, because of its cool environmental climate. Malaueg people build the largest stone convents for the friars, some nipa hut houses for Spanish Authorities and some ordinary houses for the locals. Malaueg became a center of Christianity next to Nueva Segovia after the Malaueg Church was built.

In 1607 the area was the site of Caquenga's Revolt. With the creation of the Nueva Segovia diocese in 1595 in the Cagayan Valley, Catholic missionaries from Europe began flooding into the region to convert the indigenous inhabitants to the Catholic faith. Per the Dominican account, Pagulayan, the chief of Nalfotan, had tried contacting Catholic missionaries for years. Fray Pedro then accepted the invitation and went to Nalfotan to visit Pagulayan and the Malaueg people. To his astonishment, he found a church erected and the people waiting to adopt the religion. However, Caquenga, an indigenous animist leader, or priestess, apprehended the coming of the friar. Christianity posed a threat to her indigenous animism, and Catholic missionaries and Spanish officials worked continuously to eradicate animism. In response to this threat against her spiritual beliefs, she gathered a group of followers and they revolted against the priest.

American period
During the American occupation of the Philippines, the town of Malaueg was also a favorite spot for the Americans. During the Spanish–American War, the town was almost destroyed when the soldiers used its towering mountains to hide their ammunition and dug some trenches. The Authorities were very protective of the condition of the church during war.

The town before had two municipalities, namely: Mauanan and Malaueg. The barrios on the western and northern part belonged to the municipality of Malaueg, while the barrios on the eastern part belonged to the municipality of Mauanan, where the seat of two municipal governments was established (Philippine Commission; Act nos. 943,944, 1903). Act no. 2390 changed the names of the municipalities of Santo Nino and Mauanan.

The names of the municipalities of Santo Nino and Mauanan were changed to Faire and Rizal respectively. Mauanan was named Rizal in the year 1914 and the sitios of Lattut, Capacuaan and Macatal were annexed from Rippang in 1933, under executive Order No. 690 dated March 28, 1935.

Japanese occupation
During the Japanese occupation of the Philippines in World War II, the town was largely destroyed in bombing attacks. The town also became one of the centers of resistance in the Philippines because of its forested areas that served as a hideout.

Assassination
On December 3, 2008, elected mayor Raul dela Cruz sustained bullet wounds to the body and died while being taken to the hospital in Tuguegarao City.

More violence took place on January 23, 2011, during the Town Fiesta, Police Commander Roweko and his wife together with six others were ambushed.

Geography
The place is hilly and mountainous. The poblacion is located on a plateau. The neighbouring barangays are situated on the slopes of hills and some are located along the banks of Matalag River.

Mountains

The entrance to the town is very similar to the Kennon Road of Baguio.

Barangays
Rizal is politically subdivided into 29 barangays. These barangays are headed by elected officials: Barangay Captain, Barangay Council, whose members are called Barangay Councilors. All are elected every three years.

 Anagguan
 Anurturu
 Anungu
 Baluncanag
 Batu
 Cambabangan
 Capacuan
 Dunggan
 Duyun
 Gaddangao
 Gaggabutan East
 Illuru Norte
 Lattut
 Linno (Villa Cruz)
 Liuan
 Mabbang
 Mauanan
 Masi (Zinundungan)
 Minanga
 Nanauatan
 Nanungaran
 Pasingan
 Poblacion
 San Juan (Zinundungan)
 Sinicking
 Battut
 Bural (Zinundungan)
 Gaggabutan West
 Illuru Sur

Figures stands for the list of barangays and the elevation of each.

 Anagguan = 567.3 meters (road elevation) 1400 meters (mountain elevation) 
 Anurturu = 493 meters (both road and mountain elevation)
 Anungu = 452.8 meters (both road and mountain elevation)
 Baluncanag = 402.2 meters (both road and mountain elevation)
 Batu = 570 meters (road elevation) 882 meters (mountain elevation) 
 Cambabangan = 682.6 meters (both road and mountain elevation)
 Capacuan = 390 meters (both road and mountain elevation)
 Dunggan = 685 meters (road elevation) 954.4 meters (mountain elevation)
 Duyun = 239.7 meters (both road and mountain elevation)
 Gaddangao = 109 meters (both road and mountain elevation)
 Gaggabutan East = 579.8 meters (road elevation) 880.9 meters (mountain elevation)
 Illuru Norte = 445 meters (road elevation) 843 meters (mountain elevation)
 Lattut = 824.1 meters (both road and mountain elevation)
 Linno (Villa Cruz) = 690 meters (both road and mountain elevation)
 Liuan = 390 meters (both road and mountain elevation)
 Mabbang = 389 meters (both road and mountain elevation)
 Mauanan = 569 meters (road elevation) 968.5 meters (mountain elevation)
 Masi (Zinundungan) = 1290 meters (both road and mountain elevation)
 Minanga = 790 meters (both road and mountain elevation)
 Nanauatan = 580.7 meters (both road and mountain elevation)
 Nanungaran = 577.1 meters (both road and mountain elevation)
 Pasingan = 700 meters (both road and mountain elevation)
 Poblacion = 1004 meters (both road and mountain elevation)
 San Juan (Zinundungan) = 1292 meters (both road and mountain elevation)
 Sinicking = 230 meters (road elevation) 899 meters (mountain elevation)
 Battut = 810 meters (both road and mountain elevation)
 Bural (Zinundungan) = 762.9 meters (both road and mountain elevation)
 Gaggabutan West = 469.2 meters (road elevation) 880.7 meters (mountain elevation)
 Illuru Sur = 456 meters (road elevation) 844 meters (mountain elevation)

Climate

Demographics

The local languages are Malaueg and Ilocano.

Economy

Government

Rizal, belonging to the second legislative district of the province of Cagayan, is governed by a mayor designated as its local chief executive and by a municipal council as its legislative body in accordance with the Local Government Code. The mayor, vice mayor, and the councilors are elected directly by the people through an election which is being held every three years.

Elected officials

Education
The Schools Division of Cagayan governs the town's public education system. The division office is a field office of the DepEd in Cagayan Valley region. The office governs the public and private elementary and public and private high schools throughout the municipality.

Tourism

The tourism development includes the Alsung Cave, the Sinicking National Park and Mount Annaguan forest reservations that will serve as the home for the rare species exclusively found in the area.
San Raimundo de Peñafort Church The church, also known as Malaueg Church, was built in 1597. It was under the patronage of St. Raymond of Penyafort. The Dominican fathers accepted the ecclesiastical administration of this town on April 26, 1590. The cornerstone was laid November 26, 1597. The church and the convent have been destroyed and rebuilt four times. A site visited by Roman Catholic pilgrims, believed to show luck to the people in the certain town.
Mount Annaguan The highest peak of the town that can view some places of the province of Cagayan.

Infrastructure
The Cagayan–Apayao Road connects Rizal and nearby Conner to the neighboring towns of Tuao, Piat, Solana and Tuguegarao City. The  road from Tuao to Rizal is rough and can take up to one-half-hours. It will take another half-hour ride from Tuguegarao to Tuao.

The provincial road was opened in 1951. From 1951 to 1986, one had to cross the Matalag River with a ferry boat made out of bamboos and drum. The ferry boat loaded only one jeep or bus at a time. Traveling to Rizal from Tuao to Tuguegarao or vice versa in those days was slow and tiresome because it took the ferry boat almost an hour to ferry its load to and from the other side of the river. Vehicles were ferried on a first-come, first-served basis.

The roads to the town are along the edge of the mountain, having hairpin turns and in other barangays, the road is at the edge of the Matalag River and some are at the middle of the fields.

The following bus lines serve Rizal:
Malaueg Bus Lines
Duyun Lines 
Zinundungan Traveler

References

External links

[ Philippine Standard Geographic Code]
Philippine Census Information

Municipalities of Cagayan
Populated places on the Rio Chico de Cagayan